The Transports is a folk ballad opera written by Peter Bellamy released by Free Reed Records in 1977. It is often cited as Bellamy's greatest achievement. It featured many artists from the 1970s English folk revival, including The Watersons, Martin Carthy, Nic Jones, A. L. Lloyd, June Tabor, Martin Winsor, Cyril Tawney and Dave Swarbrick. The orchestral arrangements were by Dolly Collins.

It was named as his Folk Record of the Year by the folk music critic of The Guardian, Michael Grosvenor Myer.

Performance history

The first performance was at Norwich Castle on 23 February 1978.

In addition to the two recorded performances, subsequent concert performances were at Kempton Park Racecourse (10 June 1978), Norwich Folk Festival (15 & 16 June 1978) and Rotterdam Folk Festival (5 July 1980 - both with original Norwich Castle cast), Chester Folk Club and the Herga Folk Club in Loughborough (1980), Bracknell Festival (12 July 1981), York University (1983), Queen Elizabeth Hall, London (South Bank Summer Folk Festival 1983), Norwich Folk Club (1984), Norwich School (1985), National Folk Festival, Perth, Australia, (1985), Portsmouth Festival (1987) and Whitby Festival (1992).

A dramatic production, incorporating straight acting as well as the songs, was staged by The Great Hall Players in Norwich from 17–22 October 1988. Another staging by Crude Apache Theatre Company was performed on 27 February 2013, at Dragon Hall, King Street, Norwich. The latter was attended by members of the Norwich Folk Club original cast, The Great Hall Players cast and friends and family of Pete Bellamy.

A new production, with musical arrangements by Paul Sartin, creative direction by Tim Dalling, and cast including Nancy Kerr, Greg Russell and the members of Faustus and The Young 'Uns was created in 2017 and released as an album. The company toured the UK during January to critical acclaim

Cast (original release)
Henry Cabell: Mike Waterson
Susannah Holmes: Norma Waterson
The Turnkey: Martin Carthy
The Father: Nic Jones
The Mother: June Tabor
Abe Carman: A.L. Lloyd
The Shantyman: Cyril Tawney
The Convict: Martin Winsor
The Coachman: Vic Legg
The Transports: The Watersons
Street Singer: Peter Bellamy

Cast (40th Anniversary)
Andy Bell: Live Sound & Producer
Sean Cooney: Henry Kable
Matthew Crampton: Narrator
Tim Dalling Creative Director
David Eagle: Abe Carman
Michael Hughes: The Coachman
Nancy Kerr: The Mother
Benji Kirkpatrick: The Convict
Rachael McShane: Susannah Holmes
Saul Rose: The Shantyman
Greg Russell: John Simpson
Paul Sartin: Musical Director & Arranger, The Father

Synopsis
The story is based on an account of two convicts of the First Fleet, Henry Cabell and Susannah Holmes as given by Norfolk historian Eric Fowler. According to Fowler's research, which begins in 1783, young Henry Cabell receives a sentence of transportation for fourteen years for the burglary of a country house. Another youngster, Susannah Holmes, receives a sentence of transportation for an unrelated theft. They are imprisoned for three years (because Britain has recognised the United States and can no longer send convicts there) before being sent to New South Wales. While imprisoned they fall in love and produce a son. Refused permission to marry, Susannah (along with all the women) is to be sent alone in the First Fleet to Australia. When Susannah's son is refused passage at quayside a guard (John Simpson) takes pity on her and travels with the infant to London to appeal to the home secretary, Lord Sydney. Sydney, affected by the incident, orders that Cabell and Holmes should be reunited, married on English soil, and transported together with their son (although they were not married until their arrival in Australia). Cabell eventually becomes a constable in the new colony and enjoys commercial success.

Recordings

"The Transports - Silver Edition" was released by Free Reed on the occasion of its 25th anniversary, with the original recordings and also re-recordings of many tracks by modern-day folk artists, FRDCD-2122.

Track listing (original release)

References
Notes

Sources
BBC Radio 2 review of the Transports by Mel McClellan, March 2004 Accessed 19 September 2013

External links
 Official website

Forced migration
Convicts transported to Australia
Operas
1977 operas
Ballad operas
Operas by Peter Bellamy
Folk revival albums
Operas set in Australia
Operas set in England
Operas set in the 18th century
English-language operas
History of Norfolk